USS Androscoggin may refer to the following ships:

 , renamed Sheepscot prior to launch.

Sources
 

United States Navy ship names